A tubelight is a fluorescent lamp/bulb 

Tubelight may also refer to:

 Tubelight (2017 Hindi film), a war drama by Kabir Khan
 Tubelight (2017 Tamil film), a romantic comedy by Indra

See also
 Light tube (disambiguation)